Valentina Fossati is an Italian stem cell biologist. She is a Senior Research Investigator at the New York Stem Cell Foundation. Her research is focused on developing human stem cell-based models to study the role of glia in neurodegeneration and neuroinflammation.

Early life and education 
Fossati conducted her undergraduate studies in Pharmaceutical Biotechnology at the University of Bologna in Italy, where she also completed her doctoral degree in Developmental Biology. She then moved to the United States for her postdoctoral work at Mount Sinai School of Medicine in New York.

Career and research 
In 2011, Fossati started her independent lab at the New York Stem Cell Foundation. Her lab has established a multitude of protocols for human stem cell-based models to study glia. Fossati has a particular interest in glial cell biology and how glia contribute to neurodegenerative and neuroinflammatory diseases, particularly multiple sclerosis.

Select publications 

 Labib D, Wang Z, Prakash P, Zimmer M, Smith MD, Frazel PW, Barbar L, Sapar ML, Calabresi PA, Peng J, Liddelow SA, Fossati V. Proteomic Alterations and Novel Markers of Neurotoxic Reactive Astrocytes in Human Induced Pluripotent Stem Cell Models. Front Mol Neurosci. 2022 May 3;15:870085. doi: 10.3389/fnmol.2022.870085. PMID 35592112; PMCID: PMC9113221.
 Wang M, Li A, Sekiya M, Beckmann ND, Quan X, Schrode N, Fernando MB, Yu A, Zhu L, Cao J, Lyu L, Horgusluoglu E, Wang Q, Guo L, Wang YS, Neff R, Song WM, Wang E, Shen Q, Zhou X, Ming C, Ho SM, Vatansever S, Kaniskan HÜ, Jin J, Zhou MM, Ando K, Ho L, Slesinger PA, Yue Z, Zhu J, Katsel P, Gandy S, Ehrlich ME, Fossati V, Noggle S, Cai D, Haroutunian V, Iijima KM, Schadt E, Brennand KJ, Zhang B. Transformative Network Modeling of Multi-omics Data Reveals Detailed Circuits, Key Regulators, and Potential Therapeutics for Alzheimer's Disease. Neuron. 2021 Jan 20;109(2):257-272.e14. doi: 10.1016/j.neuron.2020.11.002. Epub 2020 Nov 24. PMID 33238137; PMCID: PMC7855384.
 Barbar L, Jain T, Zimmer M, Kruglikov I, Sadick JS, Wang M, Kalpana K, Rose IVL, Burstein SR, Rusielewicz T, Nijsure M, Guttenplan KA, di Domenico A, Croft G, Zhang B, Nobuta H, Hébert JM, Liddelow SA, Fossati V. CD49f Is a Novel Marker of Functional and Reactive Human iPSC-Derived Astrocytes. Neuron. 2020 Aug 5;107(3):436-453.e12. doi: 10.1016/j.neuron.2020.05.014. Epub 2020 Jun 1. PMID 32485136; PMCID: PMC8274549.
 Li L, Tian E, Chen X, Chao J, Klein J, Qu Q, Sun G, Sun G, Huang Y, Warden CD, Ye P, Feng L, Li X, Cui Q, Sultan A, Douvaras P, Fossati V, Sanjana NE, Riggs AD, Shi Y. GFAP Mutations in Astrocytes Impair Oligodendrocyte Progenitor Proliferation and Myelination in an hiPSC Model of Alexander Disease. Cell Stem Cell. 2018 Aug 2;23(2):239-251.e6. doi: 10.1016/j.stem.2018.07.009. PMID 30075130; PMCID: PMC6230521.
 Madhavan M, Nevin ZS, Shick HE, Garrison E, Clarkson-Paredes C, Karl M, Clayton BLL, Factor DC, Allan KC, Barbar L, Jain T, Douvaras P, Fossati V, Miller RH, Tesar PJ. Induction of myelinating oligodendrocytes in human cortical spheroids. Nat Methods. 2018 Sep;15(9):700-706. doi: 10.1038/s41592-018-0081-4. Epub 2018 Jul 25. PMID 30046099; PMCID: PMC6508550.
 Douvaras P, Sun B, Wang M, Kruglikov I, Lallos G, Zimmer M, Terrenoire C, Zhang B, Gandy S, Schadt E, Freytes DO, Noggle S, Fossati V. Directed Differentiation of Human Pluripotent Stem Cells to Microglia. Stem Cell Reports. 2017 Jun 6;8(6):1516-1524. doi: 10.1016/j.stemcr.2017.04.023. Epub 2017 May 18. PMID 28528700; PMCID: PMC5470097.
 Douvaras P, Fossati V. Generation and isolation of oligodendrocyte progenitor cells from human pluripotent stem cells. Nat Protoc. 2015 Aug;10(8):1143-54. doi: 10.1038/nprot.2015.075. Epub 2015 Jul 2. PMID 26134954.
 Smith KA, Arlotta P, Watt FM; Initiative on Women in Science and Engineering Working Group, Solomon SL. Seven actionable strategies for advancing women in science, engineering, and medicine. Cell Stem Cell. 2015 Mar 5;16(3):221-4. doi: 10.1016/j.stem.2015.02.012. PMID 25748929; PMCID: PMC4476252.
 Douvaras P, Wang J, Zimmer M, Hanchuk S, O'Bara MA, Sadiq S, Sim FJ, Goldman J, Fossati V. Efficient generation of myelinating oligodendrocytes from primary progressive multiple sclerosis patients by induced pluripotent stem cells. Stem Cell Reports. 2014 Aug 12;3(2):250-9. doi: 10.1016/j.stemcr.2014.06.012. Epub 2014 Jul 24. PMID 25254339; PMCID: PMC4176529.

Awards 

2010: The Helmsley Foundation-NYSCF Innovator award for early career investigator

2009: NYSCF-Druckenmiller Postdoctoral Research Fellowship Award, The New York Stem Cell Foundation, NY, NY

References 

Year of birth missing (living people)
Living people